Ermin Rakovič (born 7 September 1977) is a retired Slovenian footballer who played as a forward.

Career
Rakovič scored one goal in 15 caps for Slovenia.

Personal life
In 2010, Rakovič was under investigation by UEFA, together with two other Olimpija Ljubljana players, for alleged match fixing in the UEFA Europa League match between Olimpija and Široki Brijeg. Rakovič publicly denied his involvement.

In April 2011, Slovenian police investigated an illegal betting organization and have taken four persons into custody. In the days after it was reported that several present and former Slovenian footballers were allegedly involved and one of which was said to be Rakovič. After continuous claims that he was never involved in the illegal betting organization and that he has never placed any bets, Rakovič changed his statement in January 2012, stating that he was not aware that the organization where he placed his bets was illegal.

Honours
Beira Mar
Portuguese Cup 1998–99

Maribor
Slovenian Cup 2003–04

Domžale
Slovenian PrvaLiga 2006–07

Interblock
Slovenian Cup 2007–08, 2008–09
Slovenian Supercup 2008
 2006 Slovenian Player of the Year

See also
Slovenian international players

References

External links
 NZS profile 

1977 births
Living people
Sportspeople from Maribor
Slovenian footballers
Association football forwards
NK Ljubljana players
NK Celje players
NK Olimpija Ljubljana (1945–2005) players
C.D. Nacional players
S.C. Beira-Mar players
C.D. Aves players
Hapoel Petah Tikva F.C. players
NK Maribor players
NK Mura players
NK Domžale players
Diyarbakırspor footballers
NK IB 1975 Ljubljana players
NK Drava Ptuj players
NK Olimpija Ljubljana (2005) players
Shenzhen F.C. players
Slovenian PrvaLiga players
Primeira Liga players
Israeli Premier League players
Süper Lig players
Chinese Super League players
Slovenian expatriate footballers
Expatriate footballers in Portugal
Expatriate footballers in Israel
Expatriate footballers in Turkey
Expatriate footballers in China
Expatriate footballers in Austria
Slovenian expatriate sportspeople in Portugal
Slovenian expatriate sportspeople in Israel
Slovenian expatriate sportspeople in Turkey
Slovenian expatriate sportspeople in China
Slovenian expatriate sportspeople in Austria
Slovenia youth international footballers
Slovenia under-21 international footballers
Slovenia international footballers
Slovenian football managers